The Ministry of Manpower (MOM; ;) is a ministry of the Government of Singapore responsible for the formulation and implementation of policies related to the workforce in Singapore.

Organisational structure 

The Ministry oversees 3 statutory boards, the Central Provident Fund Board, the Singapore Labour Foundation and Workforce Singapore.

Statutory Boards

Central Provident Fund Board
Singapore Labour Foundation 
Workforce Singapore

Ministers
The Ministry is headed by the Minister for Manpower, who is appointed as part of the Cabinet of Singapore. The incumbent minister is Tan See Leng from the People's Action Party.

See also
 Central Provident Fund Board
 Employment in Singapore

References

External links

1998 establishments in Singapore
Government ministries of Singapore
Singapore
Singapore
Labour in Singapore